François Pierre Huon de Kermadec (circa 1726 — Brest, 15 May 1787) was a French Navy officer.

Career 
Kermadec was born to the family of Vincent Huon de Kermadec, also a Navy officer. He was the uncle of Jean-Marie Huon de Kermadec and Jean-Michel Huon de Kermadec.

On 24 April 1781, Kermadec departed Brest, captaining the 74-gun Bien-Aimé in the squadron of Admiral Lamotte-Picquet, along with the 110-gun Invincible, the 74-gun Actif, and the 64-gun ships Alexandre, Hardi and Lion, and the frigates Sibylle and Néréide and cutters Chasseur and Levrette.

In 1782, Kermadec was part of a large inquiry into French commanders after the Battle of the Saintes. The verdict, rendered on 21 May 1784, absolved most of the officers.

Sources and references 

References

Bibliography
 
 

18th-century French people
French Navy officers
1787 deaths